Floriade 1982 was a garden festival held in Amsterdam, Netherlands. The second Amsterdam Floriade was recognised by the Bureau International des Expositions (BIE) and held from April 8 to October 10, 1982. It was the 9th edition of the international horticultural exposition organised under the auspices of the Association of International Horticultural Producers (AIPH) and the third held in the Netherlands. Floriade 1982 was held at a recreation area surrounding the Gaasperplas lake in the neighborhood of Gaasperdam. The entrance to the Floriade was near the previously constructed Gaasperplas metro station.

What remained after the Floriade, after some of the structures were removed, became the Gaasperpark. The planetarium today houses a conference and meeting center. The interior furnishings of the planetarium were moved in 1988 to the Artis Planetarium.

The 76m observation tower was an attraction on the Floriade 1982. It was previously used for the bi-annual Kassel Bundesgartenschau in Germany in 1981 and before that the Münchenstein . In 1983 the attraction returned to Germany and opened in Europa-Park, where it is still operational.

References

External links

 Official website of the BIE

1980s in Amsterdam
International horticultural exhibitions
1982 in the Netherlands
Events in Amsterdam
Festivals in the Netherlands
Garden festivals in the Netherlands
1982 festivals
Floriade (Netherlands)
1982 festivals in Europe